The Pothonggang Department Store is a department store in Pyongyang, North Korea. It is located near the Pothong River ("Pothonggang" in Korean).

The Pothonggang Department Store was officially opened by Kim Jong-il in December 2010. It was reported by Forbes in 2011 that the shelves in this three-storey store were completely stocked with imported goods. Items were priced in North Korean won and included Mars bars, Heinz ketchup, high-end spirits and cigarettes, mostly imported from Asia and Europe. Apparel and shoes were available on another floor. Inexpensive Chinese clothes and furniture are also on sale.

See also

 Pyongyang Department Store No. 1

References

Buildings and structures in Pyongyang
Economy of Pyongyang
Department stores of North Korea
2010 establishments in North Korea